Unione Sportiva Opitergina is an Italian association football club, based in Oderzo, Veneto. The club was founded in 1946 after the close of Second World War.

Opitergina in the season 2010–11, from Serie D group C relegated, in the play-out, to Eccellenza Veneto, where it plays in the current season.

The team's colors are white and red.

References

External links
Official homepage

Football clubs in Italy
Association football clubs established in 1946
Football clubs in Veneto
1946 establishments in Italy